Walton Ford (born 1960 in Larchmont, New York) is an American artist who makes paintings and prints in the style of naturalist illustrations, often depicting extinct species. Each of his paintings is a meticulous, realistic study in flora and fauna, and is filled with symbols, clues, and jokes referencing texts ranging from colonial literature, to folktales, to travel guides. The paintings are complex allegorical narratives that critique the history of colonialism, industrialism, politics, natural science, and humanity's effect on the environment.

Early life and career

Ford recalled taking trips into the deep forest in Canada with his father as a child, exposing him to unspoiled wilderness.  As a teenager, Ford became immersed in the underground cartoons of the 1960s, including ZAP and anything by Robert Crumb, who he considers "a major influence".

He attended the Rhode Island School of Design, Providence, Rhode Island, and in 1982 was granted a BFA degree in Filmmaking.

He had his first major one-man show at the Brooklyn Museum in 2006 and is currently represented by the Paul Kasmin Gallery in Manhattan. In 2010, the retrospective "Walton Ford: Bestiarium" traveled from the Hamburger Bahnhof Museum Fur Gegenwart in Berlin to the Albertina in Vienna, finishing at the Louisiana Museum of Modern Art in Denmark in 2011.

His work is included in the permanent collections of the Honolulu Museum of Art, the National Museum of Wildlife Art, the Museum of Modern Art in New York, the Smithsonian American Art Museum, and the Whitney Museum of American Art. In 2012, Ford designed the cover art for the Rolling Stones greatest hits album, GRRR!, which commemorated the band's 50th Anniversary.

Ford is the recipient of several national awards and honors including a fellowship from the John Simon Guggenheim Memorial Foundation and the National Endowment for the Arts and is one of the artists profiled on the PBS series Art:21. Ford lives and works in New York City.

Example works

Tur, a 2007 large-scale work in the Smithsonian American Art Museum, depicts the aurochs, a prehistoric bull that gave rise to modern day cattle. The Latin inscription at the top left of the painting reads: "The Polish call me tur, the Germans call me aurox, and the ignorant call me bison."  Another artwork in the same museum, Visitation, from 2004, depicts a large flock of passenger pigeons gorging themselves in a field strewn with fruit and nuts. The birds’ ravenous feasting on the bounty of the land can be seen to symbolize the exploitation of natural resources perpetrated by European settlers in the New World, which ultimately led to the extinction of their species.

Dying Words from 2005 is a combination color etching, aquatint and drypoint on paper in the collection of the Honolulu Museum of Art.  In this print, the extinct Carolina parakeet replaces people in Benjamin West's famous painting, The Death of General Wolfe.

Quotes

Monographs 

Walton Ford: Pancha Tantra, Taschen Books, Köln, Germany 4th edition: 2020 
Walton Ford, Flammarion, 2015 
Walton Ford: Tigers of Wrath, Horses of Instruction Harry N. Abrams Book, 2002

References

External links 
Granary: The making of Walton Ford's Art Edition from Taschen
 Video Interview with Walton Ford from Smithsonian American Art Museum
 Biography, interviews, essays, artwork images and video clips with Walton Ford from PBS series Art:21 -- Art in the Twenty-First Century  - Season 2 (2003).
Walton Ford Interviewed by Jason Rosenfeld, The Brooklyn Rail, November 2017. 
Walton Ford - Gagosian Gallery 
Walton Ford - Galerie Max Hetzler
  Walton Ford - Paul Kasmin Gallery
Walton Ford - Vito Schnabel

Album-cover and concert-poster artists
20th-century American painters
American male painters
21st-century American painters
21st-century American male artists
Wildlife artists
1960 births
Living people
People from Larchmont, New York
Rhode Island School of Design alumni
20th-century American male artists